USS Gwin (DD-71) was one of six s built for the United States Navy. She was in commission from 1920 to 1922.

Description
They had a crew of five officers and 95 enlisted men.

The propulsion arrangements differed between the ships of the class. Gwin was powered by two Parsons steam turbines, each driving one propeller shaft, using steam provided by four Thornycroft boilers.

The ships were armed with four 4-inch (102 mm) guns in single mounts and were fitted with two  1-pounder guns for anti-aircraft defense. Their primary weapon, though, was their torpedo battery of a dozen 21 inch (533 mm) torpedo tubes in four triple mounts. During World War I, the 1-pounders were replaced by 3-inch (76 mm) anti-aircraft (AA) guns and a "Y-gun" depth charge thrower replaced the aft AA gun and the searchlight.

Construction and commissioning
Gwin, the second Navy ship named for Lieutenant Commander William Gwin, was launched on 22 December 1917 by the Seattle Construction & Drydock Company, Seattle, Washington, sponsored by Mrs. James S. Woods. She was commissioned at the Puget Sound Navy Yard in Bremerton, Washington, on 18 March 1920.

Service history

Gwin departed Puget Sound on 26 April 1920 for calls at California ports, then transited the Panama Canal bound for Newport, Rhode Island, where she arrived on 2 June 1920. She subsequently participated in operations along the United States East Coast as far south as Charleston, South Carolina.

Decommissioning and disposal

Gwin was decommissioned at the Philadelphia Navy Yard in Philadelphia, Pennsylvania, on 28 June 1922. She remained inactive there until her name was struck from the Navy List on 25 January 1937. Her hulk was sold for scrapping to the Union Shipbuilding Company of Baltimore, Maryland, on 16 March 1939.

Notes

References

 

 

Caldwell-class destroyers
Ships built in Seattle
1917 ships